Cambridgeshire (abbreviated Cambs.) is a ceremonial and non-metropolitan county in the East of England government statistical region, and popularly known as one of the three counties of East Anglia. The largest city is Peterborough, followed by the county town of Cambridge. In 1974, modern Cambridgeshire was created through the amalgamation of Cambridgeshire and Isle of Ely with Huntingdon and Peterborough, which including the historic counties of Huntingdonshire and the Soke of Peterborough. A majority of the county is locally governed by Cambridgeshire County Council in combination with the lower tier non-metropolitan district councils of Cambridge, East Cambridgeshire, Fenland, Huntingdonshire, and South Cambridgeshire. Peterborough however is governed as a unitary authority with one council, Peterborough City Council. It is bordered by Lincolnshire to the north, Norfolk to the north-east, Suffolk to the east, Essex and Hertfordshire to the south, and Bedfordshire and Northamptonshire to the west.

History

Cambridgeshire is noted as the site of Flag Fen in Fengate, one of the earliest-known Neolithic permanent settlements in the United Kingdom, compared in importance to Balbridie in Aberdeen, Scotland. Must Farm quarry, at Whittlesey has been described as 'Britain's Pompeii due to its relatively good condition, including the 'best-preserved Bronze Age dwellings ever found'. A great quantity of archaeological finds from the Stone Age, the Bronze Age and the Iron Age were made in East Cambridgeshire. Most items were found in Isleham.

The area was settled by the Anglo-Saxons starting in the fifth century. Genetic testing on seven skeletons found in Anglo-Saxon era graves in Hinxton and Oakington found that five were either migrants or descended from migrants from the continent, one was a native Briton, and one had both continental and native ancestry, suggesting intermarriage.

Cambridgeshire was recorded in the Domesday Book as "Grantbridgeshire" (or rather Grentebrigescire) (related to the river Granta).

Covering a large part of East Anglia, Cambridgeshire today is the result of several local government unifications. In 1888 when county councils were introduced, separate councils were set up, following the traditional division of Cambridgeshire, for
 the area in the south around Cambridge, and
 the liberty of the Isle of Ely.
In 1965, these two administrative counties were merged to form Cambridgeshire and the Isle of Ely.
Under the Local Government Act 1972 this merged with the county to the west, Huntingdon and Peterborough, which had been formed in 1965, by the merger of Huntingdonshire with the Soke of Peterborough (the latter previously a part of Northamptonshire with its own county council). The resulting county was called simply Cambridgeshire.

Since 1998, the City of Peterborough has been separately administered as a unitary authority area. It is associated with Cambridgeshire for ceremonial purposes such as Lieutenancy and joint functions such as policing and the fire service.

In 2002, the conservation charity Plantlife unofficially designated Cambridgeshire's county flower as the Pasqueflower.

The Cambridgeshire Regiment (nicknamed the Fen Tigers), the county-based army unit, fought in the Boer War in South Africa, the First World War and Second World War.

Due to the county's flat terrain and proximity to the continent, during the Second World War the military built many airfields here for RAF Bomber Command, RAF Fighter Command, and the allied USAAF. In recognition of this collaboration, the Cambridge American Cemetery and Memorial is located in Madingley. It is the only WWII burial ground in England for American servicemen who died during that event.

Most English counties have nicknames for their people, such as a "Tyke" from Yorkshire and a "Yellowbelly" from Lincolnshire. The historical nicknames for people from Cambridgeshire are "Cambridgeshire Camel" or "Cambridgeshire Crane", referring to the wildfowl that were once abundant in the Fens. The term "Fen Tigers" is sometimes used to describe the people who live and work in the Fens.

Original historical documents relating to Cambridgeshire are held by Cambridgeshire Archives. Cambridgeshire County Council Libraries maintains several Local Studies collections of printed and published materials, significantly at the Cambridgeshire Collection held in the Cambridge Central Library.

Symbolism

Flag
Cambridgeshire's county flag was made official on 1 February 2015, after the design was selected as an entry from design competition that ran during 2014. The design features three golden crowns, two on the top, one on the bottom that are separated by two wavy lines in the middle. The crowns are meant to represent East Anglia, and the two lines represent the River Cam and are in the University's colours.

Coat of Arms
The coat of arms, officially adopted on 1 November 1976, features two Great bustard birds supporting the arms that contain five blue straight and wavy lines to represent the county's rivers, and the tip of a castle tower at the top. The motto at the bottom reads 'Corde uno sapientes simus' in Latin, and translates to 'Let us be wise with one heart'.

Geography
 See also Geology of Cambridgeshire
Large areas of the county are extremely low-lying and Holme Fen is notable for being the UK's lowest physical point at 2.75 m (9 ft) below sea level. The highest point of the modern administrative county is in the village of Great Chishill at 146 m (480 ft) above sea level. However, this parish was historically a part of Essex, having been moved to Cambridgeshire in boundary changes in 1895.

Other prominent hills are Little Trees Hill and Wandlebury Hill (both at ) in the Gog Magog Hills, Rivey Hill above Linton, Rowley's Hill and the Madingley Hills.

Wicken Fen is a  biological Site of Special Scientific Interest west of Wicken. A large part of it is owned and managed by the National Trust.

Green belt

Cambridgeshire contains all its green belt around the city of Cambridge, extending to places such as Waterbeach, Lode, Duxford, Little & Great Abington and other communities a few miles away in nearby districts, to afford a protection from the conurbation. It was first drawn up in the 1950s.

Politics

Cambridgeshire County Council is controlled by an alliance of the Liberal Democrats, the Labour Party and independent groups, while Peterborough City Council is currently controlled by a Conservative Party minority administration.

The county contains seven Parliamentary constituencies:

Economy 
This is a chart of trend of regional gross value added of Cambridgeshire at current basic prices published (pp. 240–253) by Office for National Statistics with figures in millions of English Pounds Sterling.

AWG plc is based in Huntingdon. The RAF has several stations in the Huntingdon and St Ives area. RAF Alconbury, three miles north of Huntingdon, is being reorganised after a period of obsolescence following the departure of the USAF, to be the focus of RAF/USAFE intelligence operations, with activities at Upwood and Molesworth being transferred there. Most of Cambridgeshire is agricultural. Close to Cambridge is the so-called Silicon Fen area of high-technology (electronics, computing and biotechnology) companies. ARM Limited is based in Cherry Hinton. The inland Port of Wisbech on the River Nene is the county's only remaining port.

Education

Primary and secondary 

Cambridgeshire has a comprehensive education system with over 240 state schools, not including sixth form colleges. The independent sector includes Wisbech Grammar School, founded in 1379, it is one of the oldest schools in the country.

Some of the secondary schools act as Village Colleges, institutions unique to Cambridgeshire. For example, Comberton Village College.

Tertiary
Cambridgeshire is home to a number of institutes of higher education:

 The University of Cambridge – second-oldest university in the English-speaking world, and regarded as one of the most prestigious academic institutions in the world
 Anglia Ruskin University – has campuses located in Cambridge and Peterborough and a base at Fulbourn
 The Open University – has a regional centre located in Cambridge
 The University Centre Peterborough – operated by Anglia Ruskin University and Peterborough Regional College, located in Peterborough
 The College of West Anglia has a campus at Milton, on the northern outskirts of Cambridge and a campus at Wisbech.

In addition, Cambridge Regional College and Huntingdonshire Regional College both offer a limited range of higher education courses in conjunction with partner universities.

Settlements 

These are the settlements in Cambridgeshire with a town charter, city status or a population over 5,000; for a complete list of settlements see list of places in Cambridgeshire.
 Burwell
 Cambridge
 Chatteris
 Cottenham
 Ely
 Godmanchester
 Huntingdon
 Littleport
 March
 Peterborough
 Ramsey
 Sawston
 Sawtry
 Soham
 St Ives
 St Neots
 Wisbech
 Whittlesey
 Yaxley

See the List of Cambridgeshire settlements by population page for more detail.

The town of Newmarket is surrounded on three sides by Cambridgeshire, being connected by a narrow strip of land to the rest of Suffolk.

Cambridgeshire has seen 32,869 dwellings created from 2002 to 2013 and there are a further 35,360 planned new dwellings between 2016 and 2023.

Climate

Cambridgeshire has a maritime temperate climate which is broadly similar to the rest of the United Kingdom, though it is drier than the UK average due to its low altitude and easterly location, the prevailing southwesterly winds having already deposited moisture on higher ground further west. Average winter temperatures are cooler than the English average, due to Cambridgeshire's inland location and relative nearness to continental Europe, which results in the moderating maritime influence being less strong. Snowfall is slightly more common than in western areas, due to the relative winter coolness and easterly winds bringing occasional snow from the North Sea. In summer temperatures are average or slightly above, due to less cloud cover. It reaches  on around ten days each year, and is comparable to parts of Kent and East Anglia.

Culture

Sports

Various forms of football have been popular in Cambridgeshire since medieval times at least. In 1579 one match played at Chesterton between townspeople and University of Cambridge students ended in a violent brawl that led the Vice-Chancellor to issue a decree forbidding them to play "footeball” outside of college grounds. During the nineteenth century, several formulations of the laws of football, known as the Cambridge rules, were created by students at the University.  One of these codes, dating from 1863, had a significant influence on the creation of the original laws of the Football Association.

Cambridgeshire is also the birthplace of bandy, now an IOC accepted sport. According to documents from 1813, Bury Fen Bandy Club was undefeated for 100 years. A member of the club, Charles Goodman Tebbutt, wrote down the first official rules in 1882. Tebbutt was instrumental in spreading the sport to many countries. Great Britain Bandy Association is based in Cambridgeshire.

Fen skating is a traditional form of skating in the Fenland. The National Ice Skating Association was set up in Cambridge in 1879, they took the top Fen skaters to the world speedskating championships where James Smart (skater) became world champion.

On 6–7 June 2015, the inaugural Tour of Cambridgeshire cycle race took place on closed roads across the county. The event was an official UCI qualification event, and consisted of a Time Trial on the 6th, and a Gran Fondo event on the 7th.  The Gran Fondo event was open to the public, and over 6000 riders took part in the  race.

The River Cam is the main river flowing through Cambridge, parts of the River Nene and River Great Ouse lie within the county. In 2021 the latter was used as the course for The Boat Race. The River Cam serves as the course for the university Lent Bumps and May Bumps and the non-college rowing organised by Cambridgeshire Rowing Association.

There is only one racecourse in Cambridgeshire, located at Huntingdon.

Contemporary art
Cambridge is home to the Kettle's Yard gallery and the artist-run Aid and Abet project space. Nine miles west of Cambridge next to the village of Bourn is Wysing Arts Centre.
Cambridge Open Studios is the region's large arts organisation with over 500 members. Every year, more than 370 artists open their doors to visitors during four weekends in July.

Literature
The annual Fenland Poet Laureate awards were instigated for poets in the North of the county in 2012 at Wisbech & Fenland Museum.

Theatre
The county was visited by travelling companies of comedians in the Georgian period. These came from different companies. The Lincoln Circuit included, at various times, Wisbech and Whittlesey. The Wisbech Georgian theatre still survives as an operating theatre now known as The Angles Theatre.
In Cambridge the ADC Theatre is the venue for the Footlights.

Places of interest

Notable people from Cambridgeshire 

 
Oliver Cromwell (1599–1658), Roundhead commander in the English Civil War from 1642 to 1651, and Lord Protector of the Commonwealth of England, Scotland and Ireland from 1653 to 1658

See also
 Cambridgeshire (UK Parliament constituency) – Historical list of MPs for Cambridgeshire constituency
 Cambridgeshire Archives and Local Studies
 Cambridgeshire Constabulary
 Cambridgeshire local elections
 Cambridgeshire Police and Crime Commissioner
 Custos Rotulorum of Cambridgeshire – Keepers of the Rolls for Cambridgeshire
 Healthcare in Cambridgeshire
 List of High sheriffs of Cambridgeshire
 List of Lord Lieutenants of Cambridgeshire
 The Hundred Parishes

Explanatory notes

References

Bibliography

External links

 
 Cambridgeshire County Council
 Cambridgeshire Community Archive Network.
 Images of Cambridgeshire at the English Heritage Archive
 
 Cambridge Military History Blog
 The Flag Institute: Cambridgeshire
 Cost of living tool London

 
Counties of England established in antiquity
Counties of England disestablished in 1965
Counties of England established in 1974
Non-metropolitan counties